Konstantin Sergeyevich Shiltsov (born 7 May 2002) is a Russian football player. He plays for Pari NN on loan from FC Spartak Moscow.

Club career
He made his debut for the main squad of FC Spartak Moscow on 21 October 2020 in a Russian Cup game against FC Yenisey Krasnoyarsk.

He made his Russian Football National League debut for FC Spartak-2 Moscow on 21 November 2020 in a game against FC Tom Tomsk.

On 1 July 2022, Shiltsov joined Pari NN on loan. He made his Russian Premier League debut for Pari NN on 17 July 2022 against FC Lokomotiv Moscow.

Career statistics

References

External links
 
 Profile by Russian Football National League
 

2002 births
People from Yelets
Sportspeople from Lipetsk Oblast
Living people
Russian footballers
Russia youth international footballers
Russia under-21 international footballers
Association football midfielders
FC Spartak Moscow players
FC Spartak-2 Moscow players
FC Nizhny Novgorod (2015) players
Russian First League players
Russian Premier League players